Universo ao Meu Redor is an album by Brazilian singer Marisa Monte, released in March 2006.  It was simultaneously released with Infinito Particular. It reached number two in Brasil Hot 100 Airplay.

Track listing 
 Universo ao Meu Redor (Arnaldo Antunes/Carlinhos Brown/Marisa Monte)
 O Bonde do Dom (Arnaldo Antunes/Carlinhos Brown/Marisa Monte)
 Meu Canário (Jayme Silva)
 Três Letrinhas (Galvão/Moraes Moreira)
 Quatro Paredes (Arnaldo Antunes/Cézar Mendes/Marisa Monte)
 Perdoa, Meu Amor (Casemiro Vieira)
 Cantinho Escondido (Arnaldo Antunes/Cézar Mendes|Carlinhos Brown/Marisa Monte)
 Statue of Liberty (Fernandinho Beat Box/David Byrne/Marisa Monte)
 A Alma e a Matéria (Arnaldo Antunes/Carlinhos Brown/Marisa Monte)
 Lágrimas e Tormentos (Argemiro Patrocínio)
 Satisfeito (Arnaldo Antunes/Carlinhos Brown/Marisa Monte)
 Para Mais Ninguém (Paulinho da Viola)
 Vai Saber? (Adriana Calcanhotto)
 Pétalas Esquecidas (Teresa Batista/Dona Ivone Lara)

Charts

Year-end charts

Notes

Marisa Monte albums
2006 albums